The eleventh series of the British semi-reality television programme The Only Way Is Essex was confirmed on 30 January 2014 when it had been announced that it had renewed for a further three series, the eleventh, twelfth and thirteenth. The series premiered on 23 February 2014 with a 60-minute special, and was followed by another 11 episodes. This was also the first series not to include Lucy Mecklenburgh after her departure during the Christmas special after the tenth series. The series also saw the return of Lydia Bright.  This was the penultimate series to feature on ITV2

Cast

Episodes

{| class="wikitable plainrowheaders" style="width:100%; background:#fff;"
|-style="color:white"
! style="background:#58FA58;"| Seriesno.
! style="background:#58FA58;"| Episodeno.
! style="background:#58FA58;"| Title
! style="background:#58FA58;" | Original Airdate
! style="background:#58FA58;"| Duration
! style="background:#58FA58;"| UK viewers

|}

Reception

Ratings

References

The Only Way Is Essex
2014 British television seasons